Kaunas Sports Hall, also known as the S. Darius and S. Girėnas Hall is the second largest arena of Kaunas, Lithuania. It is the first arena built in the residential Žaliakalnis neighbourhood of Kaunas specially for basketball in Europe and is referred to as a "Mecca of the Lithuanian basketball". The arena's seating capacity is 5,000. Initial seating capacity was 3,500 and the other spectators (up to 11,000) used to have standing room. It is a part of the S. Darius and S. Girėnas sport center, which also includes the nearby national stadium.

The arena generally hosts basketball games and concerts. It has served as the home court for Žalgiris basketball club, competing in the Euroleague and the LKL League till the middle of 2011. It was also used by the Granitas Kaunas team handball club.

History
The construction of the hall cost 400.000 LTL and at first had 3600 seats and 7000 standing spots. It was regarded as the biggest basketball stadium in the whole world.

Since its establishment, the Kaunas Sports Hall is situated in close proximity to the Lithuanian Academy of Physical Education and the S. Darius and S. Girėnas Stadium, adjacent to the Ąžuolynas Park. The arena was completed before the 3rd European Basketball Championship in 1939. The foundation was laid in December 1938. All the steel constructions were finished by April 1939 and masonry work on May 10 of the same year. In December 2005, it underwent a minor reconstruction and added some 525 additional seats to reach the current capacity of 5,000. Until the year 2009 it fit the criteria of the Euroleague relations for minimum seating requirements, but not after that when the minimum league's requirement to accommodate fans increased to 10,000.

In August 2011 a larger and much more modern Žalgiris Arena has been opened in Kaunas, as Lithuania was hosting the 37th European Basketball Championship. The Kaunas Sports Hall will long be remembered as the arena where the Lithuanian national basketball team won their consecutive Gold medal at the Eurobasket 1939. The Kaunas Sports Hall was included into the Registry of Immovable Cultural Heritage Sites of the Republic of Lithuania in 1993.

Most of the 2015 FIBA Europe Under-16 Championship games were held in the hall in 2015 (including the finals).

References

Indoor arenas in Lithuania
Basketball venues in Lithuania
Sport in Kaunas
Sports hall
Buildings and structures completed in 1939
Objects listed in Lithuanian Registry of Cultural Property